Katahri is a village in the West Champaran district of the Indian state of Bihar.

Demographics
As of 2011 India census, Katahri had a population of 3408 in 559 households. Males constitute 52.61% of the population and females 47.38%. Katahri has an average literacy rate of 55.28%, lower than the national average of 74%: male literacy is 61.83%, and female literacy is 38.16%. In Katahri, 18.75% of the population is under 6 years of age.

References

Villages in West Champaran district